Pedro de Alcántara Téllez-Girón y Alfonso-Pimentel, 2nd Prince of Anglona (1786–1851), was a Spanish military officer during the Peninsular War, Director of the Prado Museum between 1820 and 1823 and Captain General of Cuba (from January 1840 to March 1841). He was the 2nd Prince of Anglona in the peerage of Sardinia and the 9th Marquess of Jabalquinto in the peerage of Spain.

Biography
The second son of Pedro Téllez-Girón, 9th Duke of Osuna, the prince fought under the Duke del Parque, leading a Cavalry Division at the Battle of Tamames, the Battle of Alba de Tormes and later, under Manuel la Peña, at the Battle of Barrosa.

In 1811 he married María del Rosario Fernández de Santillán y Valdivia, daughter of the Marquis de Motilla. They had 6 children.

On 30 October 1812, he was sent by the Cortes to arrest General Francisco Ballesteros, the commander of the 4th Army who, earlier that month, had called for a military uprising in protest against Wellington's appointment as generalissimo of the Spanish Army.

By April 1814, he was in command of Spain's 3rd Army as it crossed into France to occupy Pau.

After the War and the outbreak of the Liberal Triennium in 1820, he replaced his brother-in-law José Gabriel de Silva-Bazán y Waldstein as Director of the Prado Museum until 1823, when he had to take refuge in Italy after the French invaded the country.

From January 1840 to March 1841, he was Captain General of Cuba.

Back in Spain, he was Director of the Real Academia de Bellas Artes de San Fernando from 1849 until his death in 1851.

See also
Grandee of Spain

References

1786 births
1851 deaths
Spanish army officers
Spanish generals
Spanish commanders of the Napoleonic Wars
Directors of the Museo del Prado
Governors of Cuba